Alternating electric field therapy, sometimes called tumor treating fields (TTFields), is a type of electromagnetic field therapy using low-intensity, intermediate frequency electrical fields to treat cancer. A TTField-generating device manufactured by the Israeli company Novocure is approved in the United States and Europe for the treatment of newly diagnosed and recurrent glioblastoma multiforme (GBM), and is undergoing clinical trials for several other tumor types. Despite earning regulatory approval, the efficacy of this technology remains controversial among medical experts.


Medical uses

Recurrent glioblastoma
The American National Comprehensive Cancer Network's official guidelines list TTFields as an option for the treatment of recurrent glioblastoma, but note substantial disagreement among the members of the expert panel making this recommendation. High-quality evidence for the efficacy of TTFields in oncology is limited. The first randomized clinical trial evaluating TTFields was published in November, 2014, and evaluated efficacy of this approach in patients with recurrent glioblastoma. This trial was the primary basis for regulatory approval of NovoTTF-100A / Optune in the United States and Europe. In this study, patients with glioblastoma that had recurred after initial conventional therapy were randomized to treatment either with a TTFields device (NovoTTF-100A / Optune) or with their treating physician's choice of standard chemotherapy. Survival or response rate in this trial was approximately 6 months, and was not significantly better in the TTFields group than in the conventional therapy group. The results suggested that TTFields and standard chemotherapy might be equally beneficial to patients in this setting, but with different side-effect profiles. Two earlier clinical studies had suggested a benefit of TTFields treatment in recurrent glioblastoma, but definitive conclusions could not be drawn due to their lack of randomized control-groups.

Newly diagnosed glioblastoma
Initial results of a Novocure-sponsored, phase-3, randomized clinical trial of TTFields in patients with newly diagnosed glioblastoma were reported in November, 2014, and published in December 2015. Interim analysis showed a statistically significant benefit in median survival for patients treated with TTFields plus conventional therapy (temozolomide, radiation, and surgery) versus patients treated with conventional therapy alone, a result which led the trial's independent data monitoring committee to recommended early study-termination. This was the first large-scale trial in a decade to show a survival benefit for patients with newly diagnosed glioblastoma. On the basis of these results, the FDA approved a modification of the trial protocol, allowing all patients on the trial to be offered TTFields. Potential methodological concerns in this trial included the lack of a "sham" control group, raising the possibility of a placebo effect, and the fact that patients receiving TTFields received more cycles of chemotherapy than control patients. This discrepancy might have been a result of improved health and survival in TTFields-treated patients, allowing for more cycles of chemotherapy, but also could have been due to conscious or unconscious bias on the part of clinical investigators. An expert clinical review called the preliminary results "encouraging".

Recurrent ovarian carcinoma 
Novocure sponsored a phase-2 trial called INNOVATE (EF-22), in which TTFields were administered in conjunction with weekly paclitaxel chemotherapy treatment. The trial included patients with recurrent, platinum-resistant ovarian carcinoma. Results of the trial include that no adverse side effects were reported in relation to the TTField device, except for dermatitis.

Side effects
The adverse effects of TTFields in published trials to date have included topical skin rashes caused by prolonged electrode use.

Mechanism
Alternating electric field therapy / TTFields was initially described in 2004 as the use of insulated electrodes to apply very-low-intensity, intermediate-frequency alternating electrical fields to a target area containing proliferating cells. In preclinical cancer models, TTFields appeared to show selective toxicity to proliferating cells through an antimitotic mechanism. Proteins and protein complexes that are critical for mitosis and could be affected by electric fields include α/β-tubulin and the mitotic septin heterotrimer. These molecules possess an uneven distribution of charged amino acid residues (a dipole), that could prevent their normal orientation and function when exposed to alternating electric fields. In principle, this approach could be selective for cancer cells in regions of the body, such as the brain, where the majority of normal cells are non-proliferating.

During cell division, a structure called a spindle self-assembles from proteins. The spindle attaches to the 23 chromosomes and pulls the DNA into two new cells. The proteins in the spindle have a positive charge on one end and negative charge on the other end. This division is uncontrolled in cancer cells. The TTFields electric charge prevents the cancer cell from dividing, thereby preventing the cancer from growing and spreading. TFF prevents division and destroys cancers cells with electric fields while sparing healthy tissue.

Additionally, emerging evidence suggests alternating electric fields therapy may disrupt a multitude of biological processes, including DNA repair, cell permeability and immunological responses, to elicit therapeutic effects. Greater mechanistic understanding of TTFields may pave the way for new, more effective TTFields-based therapeutic combinations in the future.

Medical device
A clinical TTFields device is manufactured by Novocure under the trade name Optune (formerly NovoTTF-100A), and is approved in the United States, Japan, Israel and multiple countries in Europe for the treatment of recurrent glioblastoma. These devices generate electromagnetic waves between 100 and 300 kHz. The devices can be used in conjunction with regular patterns of care for patients, but are only available in certain treatment centers, and require specific training and certification on the part of the prescribing physician. When a TTFields device is used, electrodes resembling a kind of "electric hat" are placed onto a patient's shaved scalp. When not in use, the device`s batteries are plugged into a power outlet to be re-charged.

Society and culture

Regulatory approval

The NovoTTF-100A / Optune device was approved by the U.S. Food and Drug Administration (FDA) in April 2011 for the treatment of patients with recurrent glioblastoma, based on clinical trial evidence suggesting a benefit in this population. Because the evidence for therapeutic efficacy was not deemed conclusive, the device manufacturer was required to conduct additional clinical trials as a condition of device approval. Critics suggested that pleas of cancer patients in the room of the FDA hearing swayed the opinions of many during the related FDA panel, and that approval was granted despite "huge misgivings on several points".

Optune was approved by the FDA for newly diagnosed glioblastoma on Oct. 5, 2015, as a result of randomized phase 3 trial results that reported a 3-month advantage in overall survival and progression-free survival when added to chemotherapy with temozolomide. In the US, Medicare covers treatment, as of February 2020.

Company
Novocure Ltd. (Nasdaq: NVCR) was founded in 2000. As of December 2020, Novocure Ltd. has over 1000 employees and makes hundreds of millions of dollars in annual sales. Israeli Professor Yoram Palti, professor of physiology and biophysics at the Israel Institute of Technology, is the company's founder and chief technology officer. Novocure Ltd. owns 145 patents.

See also

Angiogenesis inhibitors
Experimental cancer treatment
Pulsed electromagnetic field therapy

References

Further reading

External links
 Treating cancer with electric fields Bill Doyle TED talk
 Can an Electric Hat Fight Tumors? comment in Science
 Alternating electric fields disrupt glioblastoma tumor growth in pilot study comment in Nature Clinical Practice Neurology
 Approval acknowledgement from FDA

Angiogenesis inhibitors
Cancer treatments
Medical devices